Narimanlu may refer to:
 Masis, Armenia, a town formed from the merger of several villages, among them Narimanlu
 Shatvan, Armenia, formerly named Narimanlu